Erika Lizeth Honstein García (born 12 May 1983 in Hermosillo, Sonora, Mexico) is a Mexican television presenter who represented her country in the 2003 Miss World pageant, held in Sanya, China on 6 December, 2003.

She has been a presenter in Matutino Express of the Mexican chain Televisa Titular of programs of interviews to great of the music like David Bisbal, Alejandro Sanz, Ana Torroja, Romeo Santos, Enrique Iglesias for Ritmoson, channel of music (televisa networks), International Film Festival of Acapulco. Interviews. Salma Hayek, Antonio Banderas and Melanie Griffith. In series she played the Queen of the South in El Capo, the master of the Tunnel. "(TV Serie) -Netflix) EntreOlivos Spanish series for channelSur (Andalusia) 2017

References

Living people
Nuestra Belleza México winners
Miss World 2003 delegates
People from Hermosillo
Mexican people of German descent
1983 births